Peace is a studio album by London-based boy choir Libera, which was released in March 2010 by record label EMI Classics.

Reception

The album peaked at No. 8 on the Billboard classical albums chart and remained on the charts for 12 weeks.

The album was reviewed by BBC Musics Daniel Ross, who criticised it for being too commercial and musically unchallenging.

Track listing

Credits

Vocal Soloist: Benedict Philipp, Joshua Madine, Tom Cully, Stefan Leadbeater, James Threadgill, Jakob De Menezes-Wood, Daniel Fontannaz, James Mordaunt, Ralph Skan
Duets: Stefan Leadbeater - Daniel Fontannaz, Benedict Philipp - Jakob De Menezes-Wood
Directed and conducted by Robert Prizeman
Produced by Ian Tilley, Robert Prizeman and Sam Coates
Assisted by Steven Geraghty, Ben Crawley and Tom Cully
Musicians: Robert Prizeman, Ian Tilley, Steven Geraghty, Fiona Pears, Jonathan Howell

Peace DeLuxe Edition

Release Date:  22 November 2010 (EU and Japan) / 7 December 2010 (US)
Vocal Soloist: Benedict Philipp, Joshua Madine, Tom Cully, Stefan Leadbeater, James Threadgill, Jakob De Menezes-Wood, Daniel Fontannaz, James Mordaunt, Ralph Skan
Duets: Stefan Leadbeater - Daniel Fontannaz, Benedict Philipp - Jakob De Menezes-Wood
Directed and conducted by Robert Prizeman
Produced by Ian Tilley, Robert Prizeman and Sam Coates
Assisted by Steven Geraghty, Ben Crawley and Tom Cully
Musicians: Robert Prizeman, Ian Tilley, Steven Geraghty, Fiona Pears, Jonathan Howell

Limited Edition Deluxe Package features:

1) Album "Peace" (2010) with 5 bonus tracks (total 18 tracks)
 Lullabye (Goodnight my Angel) (Solo: Joshua Madine)
 Eternal Light (Solos: Stefan Leadbeater, Ralph Skan)
 Going Home (Solos: Joshua Madine, Ben Philipp, Tom Cully)
 Have yourself a merry little Christmas (Solos: James Mordaunt, Ralph Skan)
 Silent Night (Solo: Tom Cully)
2) DVD with 7 Libera videos
 Lullabye (Goodnight my Angel)
 Time
 Gaelic Blessing (Deep Peace)
 Going Home
 Libera
Plus exclusive
 Introducing Libera
 Behind the scenes featurette
3) 18 month desktop calendar (Jan 2011 - Jun 2012) with photos and lyrics, and desktop stand
4) Fold-out Libera poster

References

Libera (music) albums
2010 albums